20 Projects, formerly 20 Hoxton Square Projects, was an east London art gallery run by Alex Dellal. Launched in 2007, 20 Projects was a collaborative project space, operating as a platform for emerging contemporary artists, whilst also acting as a creative hub for collaborative and independent projects.
The physical location at 20 Hoxton Square is in the former hall of the Catholic Church of St Monica.
The building was designed by the London architectural firm DOSarchitects

References

External links
http://dosarchitects.com/
Official website
New faces and the new spaces: Rebirth of the British art scene (The Independent)
Art throbs: Vito Schnabel and Alex Dellal (London Evening Standard)

Contemporary art galleries in London
2007 establishments in England

Defunct art galleries in London